Rahim Thorpe is a Canadian former soccer player who played as a forward.

Career

Youth
He played youth soccer with Brampton SC and the Toronto Lynx.

College
He played college soccer with the Sheridan Bruins. In 2018, he scored back-to-back playoff hat-tricks. Sheridan ultimately lost to Humber College in the finals, but Thorpe was named a tournament all-star.

Club
In 2015, he played with Toronto FC III in the Premier Development League. In March 2015, he signed an academy player agreement with Toronto FC II. He made his debut for Toronto FC II on March 15 against FC Montréal.

In 2016, he played with Oakville Blue Devils FC in League1 Ontario, making seven appearances. He made a single appearance the following season.

In 2018, he joined North Mississauga SC, making six appearances. He scored his first goal on May 5 against ProStars FC. In 2019, he scored 4 goals in seven league appearances, also appearing in one playoff match. He scored a hat trick on July 14, 2019, in a 9–0 victory over Toronto Skillz FC.

International
In 2015, he was called up to the Canada U18 for the Slovakia Cup.

References

Living people
Canadian soccer players
Association football forwards
Toronto FC players
Toronto FC II players
Blue Devils FC players
North Mississauga SC players
League1 Ontario players
United Soccer League players
1997 births